Platform shoes are shoes, boots, or sandals with a thick sole, usually in the range of . Platform shoes may also be high heels, in which case the heel is raised significantly higher than the ball of the foot. The sole of a platform shoe can have a continuous uniform thickness, have a wedge, a separate block or a stiletto heel. Raising the ankle increases the risk of a sprained ankle.

History
Platform shoes are known in many cultures. The most famous predecessor of platform shoes are the Zoccoli in Venice of the 15th century, designed with the functional goal of avoiding wet feet when the pavements were flooded. Depending on the current shoe fashion, platform shoes are more or less popular. In the 1970s they were widespread in both genders in Europe. Today, they are preferred by women.

Ancient

After their use in Ancient Greece for raising the height of important characters in the Greek theatre and their similar use by high-born prostitutes or courtesans in London in the sixteenth century, platform shoes, called pattens, are thought to have been worn in Europe in the eighteenth century to avoid the muck of urban streets. Of the same practical origins are Japanese geta. There may also be a connection to the buskins of Ancient Rome, which frequently had very thick soles to give added height to the wearer. Another example of a platform shoe that functioned as protection from dirt and grime is the Okobo- "Okobo" referring to the sound that the wooden shoe makes when walking. Dating back to 18th century Japan, the Okobo was worn by maikos, or geishas, during their apprenticeships. Similar to the Okobo, wooden Kabkabs were named after the sound they made upon marble flooring. Worn by Lebanese women between the 14th and 17th centuries, the straps were often made from velvet, leather, or silk while the wooden stilts were decorated with silver or pearl. The ancient Indian Paduka, which translates to footprints of the Gods, was often sported by the upper echelon as a way to mark their status. The wooden platforms were sometimes carved into different animal shapes and decorated with ivory and silver. In ancient China, men wore black boots with very thick soles made from layers of white cloths. This style of boots is often worn today onstage for Peking opera. During the Qing dynasty, aristocratic Manchu women wore a form of platform shoe with a separate high heel, a style that was later adopted in Europe during the 1590s.

Modern
Platform shoes enjoyed some popularity in the United States, Europe and the UK from the 1930s to the 1950s but not nearly to the extent of their popularity from the 1960s to the 1980s.

20th century

1930s–1950s 
In the early 1930s, Moshe (Morris) Kimel designed the first modern version of the platform shoe for actress Marlene Dietrich. Kimel, a Jew, escaped Berlin, Germany, and settled in the United States with his family in 1939 and opened the Kimel shoe factory in Los Angeles. The design soon became very popular amongst Beverly Hills elite.
In 1938, The Rainbow was a platform sandal designed by famous shoe designer Salvatore Ferragamo. “The Rainbow” was created and was the first instance of the platform shoe returning in modern days in the West. The platform sandal was designed for Judy Garland, an American singer, actress, and vaudevillian. This shoe was a tribute to Judy Garland's signature song “Over the Rainbow” performed in the Wizard of Oz in 1939. The shoe was a crafted using uniquely shaped slabs of cork that were covered in suede to build up the wedge and gold kidskin was used for the straps. His creation was a result of experimentations with new materials because of wartime rationing during World War II. Traditionally heels were built up with leather, but because of the rationing of leather, he experimented with wood and cork  The colors and design of this shoe still resemble modern shoe standards today.

In the 1940s, platforms were designed with a high arch, but as exemplified here, they originated with the heel elevated only slightly above the toes. The platform brings a heavy looking foundation to the wearer that is in direct polarity to the stiletto heel. With its reconfiguration of the arch and structure of attenuated insubstantiality, the high heel suggests the anti-gravitational effect of the dancer en pointe. On the contrary, the platform displays weightiness more like the flat steps of modern dance.

In the 1950s, platform shoes were not favored in the same way that they used to be. Fashion returned to the more elegantly shaped shoe.

1960s and 1970s 
A resurgence of interest in platform shoes in fashion began as early as 1967 (appearing in both advertisements and articles in 1970 issues of Seventeen magazine), and continued through to 1976 in Europe and Britain, when they suddenly went out of fashion. The fad lasted even further in the US, lasting until as late as the early 1980s. At the beginning of the fad, they were worn primarily by young women in their teens and twenties, and occasionally by younger girls, older women, and (particularly during the disco era) by young men. Platform shoes were considered the "party shoe." Disco-goers used their shoes to bring attention to themselves on the dance floor. 70s platform shoes were presented in dramatic and showy ways such as with glitter or tiny lights.

In 1972, at 219 Bowery in Manhattan, Carole Basetta developed a special mold for making platform shoes and was successful in selling custom-made shoes to people such as David Bowie, David Johansen of the New York Dolls, and several other punk artists. Although platform shoes did provide added height without the discomfort of spike heels, they seem to have been worn primarily for the sake of attracting attention. Many glam rock musicians wore platform shoes as part of their act. Bowie, an icon of glam rock and androgynous fashion in the 1970s, famously wore platform shoes while performing as his alter ego Ziggy Stardust.

While a wide variety of styles were popular during this period, including boots, espadrilles, oxfords, sneakers, and sandals of all description, with soles made of wood, cork, or synthetic materials, the most popular style of the late 1960s and early 1970s was a simple quarter-strap sandal with tan water buffalo-hide straps, on a beige suede-wrapped cork wedge-heel platform sole. These were originally introduced under the brand name Kork-Ease but the extreme popularity supported many imitators. Remarkably, there was very little variation in style, and most of that variation was limited to differences in height.

1980s 
As the fad progressed, manufacturers like Candie's stretched the envelope of what was considered too outrageous to wear, while others, like Famolare and Cherokee of California, introduced "comfort" platforms, designed to combine the added height of platforms with the support and comfort of sneakers, or even orthopedic shoes, and by the time the fad finally fizzled in the late 1980s, girls and women of all ages were wearing them. It may also be a by-product of this fad that Scandinavian clogs, which were considered rather outrageous in the late 1960s and early 1970s, had become classic by the 1980s.

1990s 
Vivienne Westwood, the UK fashion designer, re-introduced the high heeled platform shoe into high fashion in the early 1990s; it was while wearing a pair of Super-Elevated Gillie with five-inch platforms and nine-inch heels that the supermodel Naomi Campbell fell on the catwalk at a fashion show. However, they did not catch on quickly and platform shoes only began to resurface in mainstream fashion in the late 1990s, thanks in part to the UK singing group the Spice Girls. The all-girl group was often seen in tall platform sneakers and boots. The footwear brand Buffalo created the famous platform sneakers worn by members of the group.

The United Kingdom (and European) experience of platform shoes was somewhat different from that of the United States. The long, pointed shoes of the early 2000s, giving an elongated look to the foot, have been more popular in the US than in the UK.

21st century

2000s 
The platform shoe resurfaced in popularity in the early 2000s when the YSL Tribute Sandal appeared in 2004, quickly gaining popularity by celebrities and the fashion world for its sex appeal and added comfort of a platform sole. The shoe is continued to be released season after season, despite changes in creative directors.

2010s 
During the late 2010s, platform boots became fashionable due to a resurgence of interest in 1970s fashion. These included so-called "nothing shoes" with clear Perspex soles, and mule sandals.

Notable wearers
Gary Glitter
James Brown
Dani Filth of gothic rock band Cradle of Filth
Lady Gaga wears platform shoes out in public as well for concerts and performances.
Spice Girls
Ariana Grande
Elton John has a large collection of platform shoes, many of which were sold at auction for charity.
Lady Miss Kier
Richard Kruspe of industrial metal band Rammstein
Marilyn Manson wore platform boots on the Mechanical Animals promo, Grotesk Burlesk, and Rock Is Dead tours. For live performances, the prominent wearers were Manson, Skold, John 5, and Pogo.
Carmen Miranda 
Stevie Nicks of Fleetwood Mac
Simon Rimmer wears platform shoes at all times due to his different length legs.
Veruca Salt
Gene Simmons from Kiss
Courtney Stodden
Charli XCX

Photo gallery

See also
 Elevator shoes
 High-heeled footwear

References

Shoes
Boots
Sandals
History of fashion
1930s fashion
1940s fashion
1960s fashion
1970s fashion
1990s fashion
2000s fashion
2010s fashion
2020s fashion
1970s fads and trends
High-heeled footwear